These are the Canadian number-one albums of 2018. The chart is compiled by Nielsen SoundScan and published in Billboard magazine as Top Canadian Albums.

Number-one albums

See also
List of Canadian Hot 100 number-one singles of 2018
List of number-one digital songs of 2018 (Canada)

References

External links
 Billboard Top Canadian Albums

2018
Canada Albums
2018 in Canadian music